Mobarakabad (also Romanized as Mobārakābād; also known as Mubārakābād) is a city in Mobarakabad Rural District, in the Central District of Qir and Karzin County, Fars Province, Iran. At the 2006 census, its population was 4,230, in 880 families.

References 

Populated places in Qir and Karzin County